Stenophyllanin A is an ellagitannin. It can be found in Cowania mexicana, Coleogyne ramosissima and Quercus stenophylla.

References 

Ellagitannins